Himalmartensus is a genus of Asian tangled nest spiders first described by X. P. Wang & Ming-Sheng Zhu in 2008.

Species
 it contains five species:
Himalmartensus ausobskyi Wang & Zhu, 2008 – Nepal
Himalmartensus martensi Wang & Zhu, 2008 – Nepal
Himalmartensus mussooriensis (Biswas & Roy, 2008) – India
Himalmartensus nandadevi Quasin, Siliwal & Uniyal, 2015 – India
Himalmartensus nepalensis Wang & Zhu, 2008 – Nepal

References

External links

Amaurobiidae
Araneomorphae genera
Spiders of Asia